Paramimus is a genus of skippers in the family Hesperiidae.

References
Natural History Museum Lepidoptera genus database

Pyrginae
Hesperiidae genera
Taxa named by Jacob Hübner